Sit Down is an EP by Run On, released in 1997 through Matador Records.

Track listing

Personnel 
Rick Brown – drums, synthesizer, vocals
Sue Garner – bass guitar, guitar, piano, vocals, design
Katie Gentile – violin, organ, vocals
Alan Licht – guitar

References 

1997 EPs
Matador Records EPs
Run On (band) albums